Thunder and Mud is a 1990 musical documentary film directed by Penelope Spheeris and starring Jessica Hahn, Tawn Mastrey, and Sam Mann.

Summary
The film depicts a show as presented by Sam Mann with a local DJ host (Mastrey) alongside Jessica Hahn, who a few years prior was known as having an affair with Jim Bakker of The PTL Club; jokes involving sex and PTL are done throughout the film, which includes skits (since everything, including the fight outcome is scripted). Several bands (Grave Danger, Nuclear Assault, Tuff, She-Rok, and Young Gunns) are shown with brief performances before mud wrestling is done, with each wrestler in a fight being a representative of the bands (after each fight, a band comes onto the stage and lip-syncs one of their songs). Various wrestlers and performers are seen, such as Jeanne Basone, Tiffany Million, and Quisha; Bill Gazzari, once described as the "godfather of metal" and previously featured in Spheeris' The Decline of Western Civilization Part II: The Metal Years (1988), is also shown.

Production
When doing an interview in 1999 for The A.V. Club, Spheeris was asked about the film. She stated, "How about that for a flaming piece of crap? That was a matter of… God, how did that happen? Thank God nobody has ever asked me about that until now. There was a guy working with Miles Copeland, and he said, "Let's do a live show and tape it, and then put it out straight to video." And I said, "Like what?" It wasn't really my idea, I don't think, but he said, "How about doing heavy metal and mud wrestling and putting the two together?" I said, "Yeah." So I did it. And I don't even think I got paid for it, which is kind of pathetic, don't you think?" 

Paul Colichman, president of I.R.S. Records along with a producer of The Decline of Western Civilization Part II: The Metal Years, has stated that he and Spheeris came up with the idea, with him wanting to do a "pay-per-view event" that would combine wrestling with music, which he thought would work since he had seen mud wrestlers handing out with metal bands at 
the nightclub Gazzarri's.

Reception 
Entertainment Weekly reviewed the early career of director Penelope Spheeris which they called "flashy but desultory". They gave a Thunder and Mud a grade D.

References

External links 
 

1990 films
American documentary films
Films directed by Penelope Spheeris
Documentary films about heavy metal music and musicians
1990s English-language films
1990s American films